Nighat Butt was a Pakistani actress and singer. Nighat acted in numerous television dramas and films.

Early life
Nighat was born in 1948 in Lahore, Pakistan. She completed her studies from University of Lahore.

Career
She started stage acting and she first acted in films in 1960s. She appeared in Urdu, Punjabi and Pashto films. She also sang songs in films and she then starred in some of Abid Ali's dramas. She also appeared in telefilms and dramas. She appeared in PTV drama Samunder and Boota from Toba Tek Singh. For her contributions towards the television industry, she was honored by the Government of Pakistan with the Pride of Performance in 2018.

Personal life
Nighat was married to actor Abid Butt until his death in 2013. They had four biological children: three daughters, and one son named Nomi Butt. She also adopted and raised her deceased brother's two children (one daughter and one son).

Illness and death
She was a cancer survivor, and had developed blood pressure issues and diabetes. She died due to a cardiac arrest. She died on February 6, 2020, age 72 and was laid to rest in E-Block of Model Town in Lahore.

Filmography

Television

Telefilm

Film

Awards and recognition

References

External links
 

1948 births
20th-century Pakistani women singers
2020 deaths
20th-century Pakistani actresses
Pakistani television actresses
21st-century Pakistani actresses
Pakistani film actresses
Punjabi people
Recipients of the Pride of Performance
21st-century Pakistani women singers
Pakistani women singers
PTV Award winners